Tricolia kochii is a species of small sea snail with calcareous opercula, a marine gastropod mollusk in the family Phasianellidae, the pheasant snails.

References

Phasianellidae
Gastropods described in 1848